Richard Dixon Oldham FRS (31 July 1858 – 15 July 1936) was a British geologist who made the first clear identification of the separate arrivals of P-waves, S-waves and surface waves on seismograms and the first clear evidence that the Earth has a central core.

Life

Born on 31 July 1858 to Thomas Oldham, a Fellow of the Royal Society and geologist, Oldham was educated at Rugby School and the Royal School of Mines.

In 1879 Oldham became an assistant-superintendent with the Geological Survey of India, working in the Himalayas. He wrote about 40 publications for the Survey on geological subjects including hot springs, the geology of the Son Valley and the structure of the Himalayas and the Ganges plain. His most famous work was in seismology. His report on the 1897 Assam earthquake went far beyond reports of previous earthquakes. It included a description of the Chedrang fault, with uplift up to 35 feet and reported accelerations of the ground that had exceeded the Earth's gravitational acceleration. He also included accounts of earth-waves that could be seen travelling across the plain, and of waterspouts. During the cold season following the earthquake, the Survey carried out a re-triangulation of part of the area that had been initially surveyed in 1860. They found displacements of up to 12 feet both in distances and heights, substantially larger than could be due to errors. This was one of the earliest reports of such a re-survey.

Oldham's most important contribution to seismology was the first clear identification of the separate arrivals of different groups of waves, as detected by seismograms at distant locations. In the report of the 1897 earthquake he presented data, mainly from stations in Italy, that showed three phases. The first to arrive, the P or Primary waves, were compression waves, which he referred to as condensational.  Next came the S or Secondary waves, with lateral movement, which he referred to as distortional. The third phase was of large undulations. The times of arrival of these phases indicated that the first two had travelled through the body of the  earth, while the third were surface waves. Since these observations agreed with theory for elastic waves, they showed that the Earth could be treated as elastic in studies of seismic waves.

In subsequent papers, Oldham compared data from numerous earthquakes, with seismic observations at different distances from the epicentre. He found a discontinuity in the travel times for the S-waves at about 120° angular distance from the earthquake, suggesting refraction by a dense core with a diameter of about of about 0.4 that of the earth. Oldham was not the first to suggest that the earth had a dense core, but he provided the first direct evidence of its existence and size.

In 1903, Oldham resigned from the GSI due to ill-health and returned to the United Kingdom, living in Kew and various parts of Wales. He continued to be active in the field, publishing papers on earthquakes in Guatemala and California.

In 1908 Oldham was awarded the Lyell Medal, in 1911 made a Fellow of the Royal Society, and from 1920 to 1922 served as the President of the Geological Society of London. Later in his life he became interested in the geography and history of the Rhône delta. He died on 15 July 1936.

See also 
 Harold Jeffreys – showed that Earth's outer core is liquid
 Inge Lehmann – showed that Earth's inner core is solid
 List of geophysicists

References

Publications

External links

Oldham

1858 births
1936 deaths
British geologists
British seismologists
Fellows of the Royal Society
Lyell Medal winners